Dan Patrick O'Keefe (born October 21, 1929) is a former member of the California State Senate and the Cupertino City Council.  He was the unsuccessful 1978 Republican nominee for Congress from California's 13th congressional district.  He was first elected to the state Senate in a 1980 special election, easily defeating Santa Clara County Supervisor Rod Diridon Sr. and was narrowly defeated for re-election in 1982 by Santa Clara County Supervisor Dan McCorquodale.

Electoral history

References

External links
Join California Dan O'Keefe

California city council members
Republican Party California state senators
Living people
People from Cupertino, California
1929 births
20th-century American politicians